The men's 110 metres hurdles at the 2002 European Athletics Championships were held at the Olympic Stadium on August 9–10.

Medalists

Results

Heats
Qualification: First 2 of each heat (Q) and the next 6 fastest (q) qualified for the semifinals.

Wind:Heat 1: -0.9 m/s, Heat 2: +0.5 m/s, Heat 3: +2.0 m/s, Heat 4: -0.1 m/s, Heat 5: 0.0 m/s

Semifinals
Qualification: First 4 of each semifinal (Q) qualified directly for the final.

Wind:Heat 1: -0.5 m/s, Heat 2: +0.8 m/s

Final
Wind: +0.4 m/s

External links

110
Sprint hurdles at the European Athletics Championships